Mario Mazzacurati (21 October 1903 – 17 April 1985) was an Italian engineer and auto racer driver active in South Africa, winner of the 1936 South African Grand Prix in Bugatti cars with pseudonym Mario Massacuratti.

Born in Padua, he took a degree in geology at the University of Bologna and thus became an engineer and not a dentist as claimed by some sources. He participated at the 1929 and 1930 Mille Miglia in a Bugatti, with Amedeo Bignami as co-driver. He also retired from the 1929 Circuito di Bordino.

Sometime near 1930 he moved to South Africa for civil engineering work including building Hout Bay Harbour and roads through country towns. Was also involved in tin mining in Swaziland. Set up the "Eagle Racing Stable" in Cape Town circa 1935 and imported a number of racing cars to South Africa - like Bugatti T35B & T35C, Alfa Romeo Monza and the Maserati 6C-34. He bought a lot of ex-Nuvolari cars and it is rumoured that he indeed was a cousin of Tazio Nuvolari but not confirmed. A good driver, he made good results in local South African events including a victory at the South African GP in 1936 and third places in 1937 and 1939 at the East London circuit; he raced a semi-works supported Maserati 6CM in South Africa in 1939. Despite being a national sporting hero, as an Italian he was interned in South Africa during World War II but made a daring escape from the concentration camp.

He died in Rome in 1985.

1903 births
1985 deaths
Sportspeople from Padua
Italian racing drivers
Grand Prix drivers
Italian expatriates in South Africa